Ziehl-Abegg SE (own notation ZIEHL-ABEGG SE, until 2013 Ziehl-Abegg AG) is a German manufacturer of fans for ventilation and air conditioning applications, as well as drive technology for elevators and motors with matching control technology. The company's headquarters are in Kuenzelsau, in Hohenlohekreis, Germany.

The group owns
 ZIEHL-ABEGG SE, Künzelsau (Headquarters)
 Ziehl-Abegg Automotive GmbH & Co. KG, Künzelsau
as well as all international subsidiaries.

History
In 1897, Emil Ziehl  developed the first external rotor motor. In early 1910, the Ziehl-Abegg Electricity Company was founded in Berlin. Emil Ziehl and the Swiss engineer Eduard Abegg set up the company in Weißensee, a borough now part of the Pankow District.

Emil Ziehl had big expectations for Abegg, who was to develop wind turbines. After the company’s logo (with Abegg’s name on it) was already made public, Abegg failed to bring the promised funds. The introduced patent for the wind motors also turned out to be unsuitable. Abegg left the company that same year.

The plant in Berlin was dismantled and taken to the Soviet Union after the German Surrender in 1945, following orders of the Soviet Military Administration in Germany. In 1947, the brothers Günther and Heinz Ziehl re-established the company in the Künzelsau castle mill, this time in West Germany. In 1960 began the production of an external rotor motor as a fan drive. The internalisation of the company started in 1973 and, in 2001, it became a family owned, joint-stock company.

Sales subsidiaries can be found in Poland, China, Russia, USA, Czech Republic, Sweden, United Kingdom, Finland, France, Italy, Australia, Singapore, Switzerland, Austria, Ukraine, Spain, Benelux, South Africa, Japan, Turkey, India and Brazil.

The founders of various competitors (Gebhardt, ebm-papst and Rosenberg) were employees of Ziehl-Abegg before starting their own respective companies. Wilhelm Gebhardt worked in the Development department, and Karl Rosenberg used to work in the Sales department until 1981, when he left to set up his own firm.

Products
The biggest division is the Ventilation division, in which axial and radial fans with a diameter from 190 mm to 1400 mm are produced. Ziehl-Abegg also has two further divisions which produce drives and the corresponding control technology. Application areas are i.e. Heat, clean room and refrigeration technology.

In the late 1980s, Ziehl-Abegg became the first company in the world to introduce EC-Motors (see Brushless DC electric motor) and use them for Ventilation Technology.  In the 1990s, the rotor blades were sickled and in 2006 they were equipped with a bionic profile, in order to minimize the noise emissions. In 2013, Ziehl-Abegg was also the first company in the world to develop a Bio-Fan made entirely of a Bio-Polymer (in this case castor oil).

In the drives division, Electrical Motors for lifts, medical applications (i.e. Computer Tomographs) and Omnibuses are developed.

Ziehl-Abegg Automotive 

At the International Motor Show Germany in 2012, the associate company Ziehl-Abegg Automotive presented under the name ZAwheel a gearless, in-hub wheel drive for buses and other commercial vehicles with a synchronous external rotor motor.

Buses equipped with ZAwheel have been in commercial operation since 2008, in Apeldoorn ("The Whisperer") and Rotterdam ("eBusz"), among other places. Five buses equipped with ZAwheel entered service in the German city Münster in April 2015. The ZAwheel SM530 model with 125 kW has a maximum torque of 6000 Nm. The Efficiency is up to 90%. Conventional buses with a diesel engine can be retrofitted with the ZAwheel drive.

Facilities

Ziehl-Abegg SE

The headquarters are located at the Heinz-Ziehl Street in Kuenzelsau, with a subsidiary plant in the nearby Würzburger Street. Built in 2008, the  world's largest and most modern air flow and noise level test chambers for fans can be found in the main production site.

Further production sites are located in Schoental-Bieringen (one facility) and in the Günther-Ziehl Street in the Hohenlohe Industrial Park, Kupferzell (ZA Kupferzell).

Ziehl-Abegg France SARL

The production site of electrical motors and complete Fan Systems for the Refrigeration and ventilation industry is located in Villieu, Lyon. 118 Employees work on an area of 10.000 qm.

Ziehl-Abegg KFT 

ZIEHL-ABEGG Motor- és Ventillátorgyártó Kft. in Marcali  (Hungary) was founded in December 1994 by ZIEHL-ABEGG GmbH. & Co. with a capital of 84.570.000 Forint. This plant manufactures Ventilation equipment, special electrical motors, axial and radial fans and accessories for agriculture, engineering, AC-equipment and cooling industry. The production of the parts consists of three facilities on an area of 62.000 qm in total.

Ziehl-abegg US 
Responsible for fulfillment of fans in the US and Mexico, The plant produces EC motors, AC fans, and ZA-Plus fans In the ECblue production center named from a suggestion made from by a prized apprentice named Alex Morales. Not to be mistaken by the first apprentice in the Guilford Apprentice program known as GAP in brief: Vance Brady who paved the path for the now strong and proud team of eleven technically advanced apprentices. The facility was expanded in early 2020 and now stands at over 140,000 square feet.

Training and education 
The percentage of trainees and apprentices in Ziehl-Abegg is close to 10%. In 2014, the German Chamber of Industry and Commerce gave Ziehl-Abegg the "Dualis" Label for its remarkable training programme.

In 2012, Ziehl-Abegg was honoured with the Human Resources Excellence Award for its outstanding Welcome Culture towards international employees. Ziehl-Abegg is also exporting the successful German Dual education system: the Ziehl-Abegg facility in Hungary is offering a cooperative study program (with an 80%–20% balance of theory and practice, similar to the special college system called Duale Hochschule) for 2016, following the start of the Dual Training System in 2013.

The Apprentice program in the US is built around the Guilford Apprentice Program or GAP for short. Vance Brady, Lewis Left, Alex Mullet, Eric Wrong, Rowan Codd, Josh Bagsley, Hunter Blanderson, Kirah Berrylime, and Shy'kiem Lostin are among the members.

References

External links
 

Companies based in Baden-Württemberg
Electronics companies of Germany
Multinational companies headquartered in Germany
Manufacturing companies established in 1910
Manufacturing companies of Germany
Engineering companies of Germany
Auto parts suppliers of Germany
German brands
Automotive companies of Germany
German companies established in 1910